Achyranthes talbotii is a species of plant in the family Amaranthaceae. It is found in Cameroon and Nigeria. Its natural habitats are subtropical or tropical moist lowland forests and rivers. It is threatened by habitat loss.

References

talbotii
Taxonomy articles created by Polbot